Phaktep  is a village development committee in Panchthar District in the Province No. 1 of eastern Nepal. At the time of the 1991 Nepal census it had a population of 3601.

References

Populated places in Panchthar District